Pietro Crinito (22 May 1474 – 5 July 1507), known as Crinitus, or Pietro Del Riccio Baldi (derived from Riccio, 'curly', translated into Latin as crinitus), was a Florentine humanist scholar and poet who was a disciple  of Poliziano. 

He is best known for his 1504 commonplace book, De honesta disciplina. This has been taken to be a source for the work of Nostradamus.

External links
 (French language page)
 (Italian language page)

1475 births
1507 deaths
Italian Renaissance humanists